The Division of Warringah is an Australian electoral division in the state of New South Wales.

Geography
Since 1984, federal electoral division boundaries in Australia have been determined at redistributions by a redistribution committee appointed by the Australian Electoral Commission. Redistributions occur for the boundaries of divisions in a particular state, and they occur every seven years, or sooner if a state's representation entitlement changes or when divisions of a state are malapportioned.

History
The division is named after the Warringah area of Sydney, which itself is named by an Aboriginal Australian word which translates into English as "rain", "waves" or "sea". The Division was proclaimed at the redistribution of 13 September 1922, and was first contested at the 1922 federal election. The word "Warrin ga" was recorded as the local name for Middle Harbour in 1832.

Centred on Mosman and the Northern Beaches region of Sydney, it covers most of the land between Middle Harbour and the Tasman Sea. It extends from Port Jackson in the south to the suburb of Dee Why in the north. It includes the suburbs of Allambie, Allambie Heights, Balgowlah, Balgowlah Heights, Balmoral, Beauty Point, Brookvale, Clifton Gardens, Clontarf, Cremorne Point, Curl Curl, Fairlight, Freshwater, Killarney Heights, Kurraba Point, Manly, Manly Vale, Mosman, North Balgowlah, North Curl Curl, North Head, North Manly, Queenscliff, Seaforth, and Wingala; as well as parts of Beacon Hill, Cremorne, Dee Why, Forestville, Frenchs Forest, Narraweena, and Neutral Bay.

The Northern Beaches have long been a stronghold for the Liberal Party of Australia. The Liberals and their predecessors held the seat without interruption from its creation in 1922 until the 2019 federal election when Zali Steggall won the seat as an independent. Even by northern Sydney standards, Warringah has been especially unfriendly territory for Labor. For example, even in its 1943 landslide, Labor was only able to garner 39 percent of the two-party vote in Warringah; Labor has never won more than 40.5 percent of the two-party vote in any election for this seat.

Before 2019, the area covered by Warringah had been held by a conservative party without interruption since Federation; most of its territory had been part of North Sydney from 1901 to 1922. Most of Warringah's northern portion became the equally conservative Mackellar in 1949.

The seat's most notable member was Tony Abbott, who won the seat at a 1994 by-election and served as Prime Minister of Australia from 2013 to 2015. He retained Warringah until being defeated by Steggall in 2019. That election also saw Warringah become a notional marginal seat in a "traditional" two-party contest against Labor for the first time; Abbott would have held the seat on 52.1 percent against Labor, down from 61 percent in 2016.

Members

Election results

References 

Electoral divisions of Australia
Constituencies established in 1922
1922 establishments in Australia
Northern Beaches